Mariam Reuben Kasembe (born 26 August 1957) is a Tanzanian CCM politician and Member of Parliament for Masasi constituency since 2010.

References

1957 births
Living people
Chama Cha Mapinduzi MPs
Tanzanian MPs 2005–2010
Tanzanian MPs 2010–2015